Flaveria is a genus of plants in the family Asteraceae. They are sometimes called yellowtops. Some are annual or perennial herbs and some are shrubs. They bear yellow flowers in heads, with zero, one, or two ray florets in each head. These plants are found in the Americas, Asia, Africa, and Australia.

While some members of this genus use the more common  carbon fixation pathway, others are  plants, and some are intermediate. With closely related species exhibiting different forms of metabolism, Flaveria has been a model genus for studies on the evolution of photosynthesis. A monograph by A.M. Powell from 1978 is the most comprehensive study of morphology and biogeography for the Flaveria species to date. Molecular phylogenetic studies have clarified many of the evolutionary relationships between Flaveria species.

 Species
 Flaveria angustifolia  - Mexico (Oaxaca, Puebla, Guerrero); – intermediate
 Flaveria anomala  - Mexico (San Luis Potosí, Nuevo León, Durango, Zacatecas) 
 Flaveria australasica - speedyweed - Australia; 
 Flaveria bidentis - coastal plain yellowtops - South America, Galápagos, West Indies, United States (Florida Georgia Alabama); 
 Flaveria brownii - Brown's yellowtops - southern Texas; -like
 Flaveria campestris - alkali yellowtops - USA (Arizona New Mexico Texas Utah Colorado Kansas Missouri Indiana)
 Flaveria chlorifolia - clasping yellowtops - Mexico (Chihuahua), New Mexico Texas; – intermediate
 Flaveria cronquistii -  Mexico (Oaxaca, Puebla) 
 Flaveria floridana - Florida yellowtops - Florida; – intermediate
 Flaveria haumanii - Chile, Argentina
 Flaveria intermedia -  Mexico (Durango) 
 Flaveria kochiana -  Mexico (Oaxaca); 
 Flaveria linearis - narrowleaf yellowtops - Cuba, Bahamas, Florida, Yucatán Peninsula
 Flaveria maritima Kunth 
 Flaveria mcdougallii Theroux, Pinkava & D.J.Keil
 Flaveria oppositifolia  - Mexico (Chihuahua, Coahuila, Hidalgo, Nuevo León, San Luis Potosí), Texas
 Flaveria palmeri  -  Mexico (Coahuila); -like
 Flaveria pringlei -  Mexico (Puebla, Oaxaca, Guerrero) 
 Flaveria pubescens - Mexico (San Luis Potosí, Tamaulipas); – intermediate 
 Flaveria ramosissima - Mexico (Puebla, Oaxaca); – intermediate
 Flaveria robusta -  Mexico (Colima) 
 Flaveria sonorensis -  Mexico (Chihuahua, Sonora); – intermediate
 Flaveria trinervia - clustered yellowtops - Mexico, Belize, South America, West Indies, California Arizona New Mexico Texas Missouri Florida South Carolina Virginia Maryland Massachusetts); 
 Flaveria vaginata B.L.Rob. & Greenm.; -like

References

External links
 USDA Plants Profile for Flaveria
 Jepson Manual Treatment of Flaveria

 
Asteraceae genera